Microbacterium murale is a Gram-positive bacterium from the genus Microbacterium which has been isolated from an indoor wall in Giessen in Germany.

References

External links
Type strain of Microbacterium murale at BacDive -  the Bacterial Diversity Metadatabase	

Bacteria described in 2012
murale